Brace for Impact (also known as Final Destiny in US release) is a Canadian television film, directed by Michel Poulette and released in 2016. The film stars Kerry Condon as Sofia Gilchrist, a disgraced airplane crash investigator whose brother has been killed in an airline crash, and who is secretly investigating the crash herself in defiance of her supervisor's orders. The film's cast also includes Sheila McCarthy and Ennis Esmer.

The film premiered in November 2016 on Super Écran in French, and in December 2016 on The Movie Network in English.

Esmer received a Canadian Screen Award nomination for Best Supporting Actor in a Drama Program or Series at the 6th Canadian Screen Awards.

References

External links 
 

2016 television films
2016 films
Canadian drama television films
English-language Canadian films
Films directed by Michel Poulette
Crave original programming
2016 drama films
2010s English-language films
2010s Canadian films